Stenosepala is a genus of flowering plants belonging to the family Rubiaceae.

Its native range is Panama to Colombia.

Species
Species:
 Stenosepala hirsuta C.H.Perss.

References

Rubiaceae
Rubiaceae genera